Constance Grewe (born 14 December 1946 in Stuttgart) is a German academic, former judge of the Constitutional Court of Bosnia and Herzegovina.

Biography 

Grewe earned her bachelor's degree at Frankfurt in 1966 and completed her studies in law in Germany until 1967 and in France at the Faculty of Law in Caen  from 1967 until 1974. In 1979 she obtained her Ph.D. at the University of Caen with a thesis on Germany's cooperative federalism. From 1981 to 1983 she was professor at the University of Chambéry and from 1983 to 1997 professor at the University of Caen. She was responsible for the Fundamental Rights Research Department. Since 1997 she has been professor at the University Robert Schumann of Strasbourg. In period from 1998 to 2000 she was Director of the Institute of Comparative Law. She is a member of the Institut de recherche Carré de Malberg (IRCM) and since September 2003 she is the Head of IRCM.

She published a number of books and scientific articles from the field of Comparative Constitutional Law, German Constitutional Law and interactions between international and internal law.

She was a member of the Scientific Council of the University of Caen until 1997. Since 1997 she has been a member of the Scientific Council of the University Robert Schumann of Strasbourg. Since September 2003 she is a vice president in charge of research.

In addition she is a member of the executive committee of the Association française des constitutionnalistes (AFDC) and of the Societas iuris publici europaei (SIPE). She is also a member of the Editorial Advisory Board of the Law Journal EuGRZ (Europäische Grundrechte Zeitschrift) and an expert at the Council of Europe.

On 24 May 2004 she was appointed international judge at the Constitutional Court of Bosnia and Herzegovina by the President of the European Court of Human Rights. She served until age 70 in 2016.

References

External links
Constance Grewe Constitutional Court of Bosnia and Herzegovina

1946 births
Living people
Legal educators
Legal writers
German women judges
University of Caen Normandy alumni
Academic staff of the University of Caen Normandy
German judges on the courts of Bosnia and Herzegovina
Judges of the Constitutional Court of Bosnia and Herzegovina
German legal scholars
Scholars of constitutional law
Constitutional court women judges
20th-century German judges
21st-century German judges
Women legal scholars
20th-century women judges
21st-century women judges
20th-century German women
21st-century German women